Klíny is a municipality and village in Most District in the Ústí nad Labem Region of the Czech Republic. It has about 200 inhabitants.

Administrative parts
Villages of Rašov and Sedlo are administrative parts of Klíny.

References

Villages in Most District
Villages in the Ore Mountains